Guggenberger is a German surname. Notable people with the surname include:

Friedrich Guggenberger (1915–1988), German admiral and U-boat commander
Ilse Guggenberger (born 1942), Colombian chess player
Mark Guggenberger (born 1989), American ice hockey player
Matthias Guggenberger (born 1984), Austrian skeleton racer
Vinzenz Guggenberger (1929–2012), German Roman Catholic bishop
Walter Guggenberger (born 1947), Austrian civil servant and politician

German-language surnames